Martin Olofsson (10 November 1891 – 11 October 1991) was a Swedish weightlifter. He competed at the Summer Olympics in 1920 and 1924.

References

External links
 

1891 births
1991 deaths
Swedish male weightlifters
Olympic weightlifters of Sweden
Weightlifters at the 1920 Summer Olympics
Weightlifters at the 1924 Summer Olympics
Sportspeople from Linköping
Sportspeople from Östergötland County
20th-century Swedish people